Luca Visentini (born 1969) is an Italian trade unionist. Elected general secretary of the International Trade Union Confederation (ITUC) at the organisation's 5th World Congress in Melbourne, Australia, in mid-November 2022, he stood aside on 14 December 2022 following his arrest and conditional release in relation to the Qatar corruption scandal at the European Parliament. On 11 March 2023, the ITUC General Council voted to dismiss Visentini for accepting funds from Antonio Panzeri. 

He was previously the General Secretary of the European Trade Union Confederation (ETUC). He was reelected at the ETUC Congress in Vienna in May 2019, having been first elected in 2015. He has been active in the European trade union movement since the late 1980s, at regional, national and European Union levels.

Background
After studying philosophy at the University of Trieste, in 1989, he joined the Unione Italiana de Lavoro (UIL), initially taking responsibility for the union’s youth work. In the same year he was selected as General Secretary of UIL’s Federation for Tourism, Trade and Services in Friuli Venezia Giulia.

In 1996, he became General Secretary of UIL in Friuli Venezia Giulia and a member of the union’s national steering and executive committees, as well as General Secretary of the UIL Confederal Chamber of Labour of Trieste. His work covered a wide range of issues including collective bargaining and wages, social dialogue, industrial, labour market and economic policy, social security and public services, as well as communications and human resource management.

The following year, he became active at the European level as President of the Inter-Regional Trade Union Council (IRTUC) linking Friuli Venezia Giulia, Veneto and Croatia, and a member of the ETUC IRTUCs Coordination Committee. From 2007-2011 he was committee Vice-President and served on the ETUC's Economic and Employment Committee.

European Trade Union Confederation, 2011–2022 
Visentini was elected as ETUC Confederal Secretary at the 12th ETUC Congress in Athens in May 2011. His responsibilities included: Collective bargaining and wage policy; Migration and mobility; Education and training; EU budget, structural funds, economic and social cohesion, regional policy; IRTUCs and the EURES Network.

He took part and coordinated workers’ group activities in the European Social Fund Committee; Structured Dialogue for the European Structural and Investment Funds; Advisory Committee for Free Movement of Workers; Directors General Committee for Vocational Education and Training; Advisory Committee for Vocational Education and Training; and Integration Forum for Migrants.

Since the ETUC Congress in Paris (October 2015), following his election as ETUC General Secretary, he has also been General Secretary of PERC (Pan-European Regional Council), the ITUC regional organisation representing trade unions across the whole European continent. 
He was re-elected as General Secretary of the ETUC at Congress in Vienna, in May 2019.

International Trade Union Confederation, 2022–present 
Luca Visentini was elected as ITUC General Secretary at the 5th ITUC World Congress in Melbourne, Australia, 17-22 November 2022.

Arrest

In December 2022, just days after being elected as General Secretary of ITUC, Visentini was arrested as part of the Qatar corruption scandal at the European Parliament in which Qatar had allegedly paid large sums of cash for influence at the European Parliament.  After two days in custody, Visentini was conditionally released.

Other activities
In addition, Luca was President of ISSES, UIL Trieste’s research institute for historical, economic and social studies (2006–2011), President of the Friuli Venezia Giulia branch of UIL’s vocational education and training provider ENFAP (2002–2006), and on the board of Italian International Research Centres Elettra-Sincrotrone and AREA Science Park.

In his spare time, Luca is a successful poet and writer, publishing four books of poetry and novels between 2004 and 2012, and has headed a number of cultural associations and networks in the fields of literature and theatre.

See also
 Qatar corruption scandal at the European Parliament

Bibliography
Traduzioni perdute, Ibiskos, 2004
Corridoio 5, Racconti dal caffè di mezza Europa, Danilo Zanetti Editore, 2004
Goffi erotismi pagani, Ibiskos, 2007
Prima della rivoluzione, Lietocolle, 2012

References

External link

1969 births
Living people
European Trade Union Confederation
Italian male poets
Italian trade unionists